Dobrynskoye was a military air base in Vladimir Oblast, Russia. Dobrynskoye was an airfield of the Soviet Air Force housing fighter aircraft which appeared on aeronautical charts in the 1970s and 1980s. By the 1990s the airfield disappeared from the charts, and is now believed to be inactive and abandoned.

References
RussianAirFields.com

Soviet Air Force bases